Heraclius or Eraclius ( 1128 – 1190/91), was archbishop of Caesarea and Latin Patriarch of Jerusalem.

Origin and early career

Heraclius was from the Gévaudan in Auvergne, France. Like his later rival William of Tyre he studied law at the University of Bologna: his contemporaries and friends included Stephen of Tournai and Gratian. He arrived in the Kingdom of Jerusalem before 1168, where he first appears as magister Heraclius, witnessing patriarchal deeds. He was appointed archdeacon of Jerusalem in 1169. In this capacity he tried unsuccessfully to persuade Pope Alexander III to reinstate Gilbert d'Aissailly as Grand Master of the Knights Hospitaller, although the Pope praised him for his presentation of the case. By 1175 he was archbishop of Caesarea (while William served as archbishop of Tyre). As archbishops, Heraclius and William attended the Third Lateran Council in 1179. In 1180, William considered himself the most likely candidate for the patriarchate of Jerusalem, but the king, Baldwin IV, delegated the choice to his mother Agnes of Courtenay, Lady of Sidon, and her ladies, according to the precedent of the previous election in 1157. Agnes and her committee chose Heraclius.

Because most of information about Heraclius comes from his rival William and the 13th-century Old French Continuation of his chronicle, sometimes attributed to Ernoul, Heraclius is often seen as a particularly corrupt and worldly choice for patriarch. He was accused of getting the appointment through being Agnes's lover, which may reflect nothing more than the ill-will of his defeated opponent's party. He lived openly with a draper's widow from Nablus, Pasque de Riveri, who was referred to as "Madame la Patriarchesse", by whom he had at least one daughter. However, clerical concubinage was hardly rare in the 12th century. The claim in the Old French Continuation that he excommunicated William in 1183, forcing him to leave the kingdom to seek the Pope's help in Rome, and arranged for him to be poisoned there, is demonstrably false. No Western chroniclers noted what would (if true) have been a major ecclesiastical scandal. William did not die until 1185 or 1186, and was carrying out his duties as Archbishop to the end.

Travel
In 1184, Heraclius, along with Roger de Moulins, Grand Master of the Knights Hospitaller, and Arnold of Torroja, Grand Master of the Knights Templar, travelled to Europe to seek help in solving the looming succession crisis in the kingdom. They carried with them  the keys of the city of Jerusalem, the Holy Sepulchre and the Tower of David, along with other memorabilia. The mission visited Italy (Arnold of Torroja died at Verona), then France and England. Here they had several meetings with Henry II initially at Reading, afterwards at London (consecrating the church at the new Hospitallers' priory and headquarters at Clerkenwell). The king then accompanied the mission to France, where a further meeting was held in early May 1185 with Philip II and it was agreed to send both men and money to the Holy Land. This did not satisfy Heraclius, who had hoped to take back with him either Henry himself or one of his sons. Henry had promised to go on crusade years before after the murder of Thomas Becket; Heraclius reminded him of the vow and declared him and his children to be of the devil when Henry chose to stay at home.

England
While in England, Heraclius consecrated the Temple Church in London, the English headquarters of the Knights Templar; for which act he is perhaps best remembered in England today. The chronicler Ralph Niger reports that on this mission Eraclius offered the kingship of Jerusalem to Philip II of France and Henry II of England (but both turned him down) and to any other prince he came across. Ralph claimed that Heraclius's enormous retinue and opulent dress offended the sensibilities of many westerners, who felt they were not befitting a patriarch; surely if the east was so wealthy, no help was needed from the west. It may be, however, that he was unprepared for the Byzantine style of dress favoured by the court of Jerusalem since Amalric I's marriage to Maria Comnena. Other chroniclers, Peter of Blois, Gerald of Wales, Herbert of Bosham and Rigord, were more impressed by the Patriarch's spiritual qualities, describing him in phrases such as "vir sanctus et prudens", "vir sanctus" and "vitae sanctitatae non inferior".

Return
Heraclius returned to Jerusalem late in 1185. Baldwin IV had meanwhile died and had been succeeded as King by his young nephew, Baldwin V. The boy king died in summer 1186. The heir was his mother Sibylla, but her husband, Guy of Lusignan, a relative newcomer to the kingdom, was widely disliked by the nobility. It was agreed that Sibylla would be crowned only after she had divorced Guy; in return she insisted on choosing her new husband for herself, with the understanding that the husband she chose would become king. Heraclius crowned her. To the astonishment of the assembled nobility she took the crown and placed it on Guy's head, with the words (as given by Roger of Howden), "I choose you as king, and my lord, and lord of the land of Jerusalem, because those whom God has joined no man must separate." No one dared to object, and Heraclius anointed Guy King of Jerusalem.

Defense of Jerusalem

In 1187, Saladin invaded the kingdom, and when Guy marched out to meet him, he asked Heraclius to march along with him at the head of the army with the relic of the True Cross. As Heraclius was ill, the bishop of Acre took his place. Despite the relic, Saladin inflicted a crippling defeat on them at the Battle of Hattin on July 4, capturing the king. Heraclius' report of the battle and its immediate aftermath, addressed to Pope Urban III, survives; according to the Chronicle of Ernoul "Pope Urban, who was at Ferrara, died of grief when he heard the news". In the letter, he said that, without external aid, both Jerusalem and Tyre would fall within six months.

In Jerusalem Heraclius urged Balian of Ibelin to lead the defence of the city against Saladin. He ordered the stripping of the silver from the edicule in the Church of the Holy Sepulchre to strike coins with which to pay the city's defenders. But Jerusalem was finally forced to capitulate on October 2. It was Heraclius who advised Balian to come to terms rather than fight to the death, which, he argued, would condemn the city's women and children to slavery and forced conversion. Heraclius helped Balian negotiate the surrender with Saladin, who allowed him and most of the other Christians leave the city unharmed.

He and Balian had organised, and contributed to, a collection of 30,000 bezants to ransom the poorer citizens. This paid the ransoms for about 18,000 people, but another 15,000 people still needed to be paid for. Heraclius and Balian offered themselves as hostages in exchange for them, but Saladin refused, and so these remaining citizens were enslaved. The two men led the last party of refugees from the city at the end of the 40-day ransom period (mid-late November).

Saladin's secretary Imad al-Din al-Isfahani claimed that Heraclius stripped the gold reliquaries from the churches on the Temple Mount, and carried away cartloads of treasure with him.

After the capture of Jerusalem, Heraclius sought refuge in Antioch, together with the queen. He then took part in the Siege of Acre, where his arrival heartened the army. Like so many others, he died of disease during the Third Crusade in the winter of 1190–1191.

Fiction
To date, the fictional representations of Heraclius are all derived from the negative portrayal in the Old French Continuation of William of Tyre: see Gotthold Ephraim Lessing's Nathan der Weise, Zofia Kossak-Szczucka's Król trędowaty (The Leper King), Manuel Mujica Láinez's El unicornio (The Wandering Unicorn), Graham Shelby's Knights of Dark Renown and Jan Guillou's The Knight Templar. As played by Jon Finch in  the 2005 movie Kingdom of Heaven, he is an entirely cowardly and bigoted figure. In the Director's Cut, Baldwin IV is even depicted as refusing the viaticum from him.

Notes

Sources
Peter W. Edbury, "Propaganda and Faction in the Kingdom of Jerusalem: The Background to Hattin", in  Crusaders and Muslims in Twelfth-Century Syria, ed. Maya Shatzmiller, 1993.
Peter W. Edbury, The Conquest of Jerusalem and the Third Crusade: Sources in Translation. Ashgate, 1996. [Includes Eraclius's letter to Urban III after the battle of Hattin (pp. 162–3: see also p. 47).]
Bernard Hamilton, The Leper King & His Heirs, 2000
Benjamin Z. Kedar, "The Patriarch Eraclius", in Outremer: Studies in the History of the Crusading Kingdom of Jerusalem presented to Joshua Prawer, ed. B. Z. Kedar, H. E. Mayer, and R. C. Smail, 1982.

1120s births
1190s deaths
Latin Patriarchs of Jerusalem
12th-century Roman Catholic archbishops in the Kingdom of Jerusalem
12th-century people of the Kingdom of Jerusalem
12th-century French people
Latin archbishops of Caesarea